Orlandini is an Italian surname. Notable people with the surname include:

Giulio Orlandini, Italian painter
Giuseppe Orlandini (born 1922), Italian film director and screenwriter
Giuseppe Maria Orlandini (1676–1760), Italian Baroque composer
Leovanna Orlandini (born 1978), Ecuadorian beauty pageant winner
Lia Orlandini (1896–1979), Italian actress
Niccolò Orlandini (1554–1606), Italian Jesuit writer
Pierluigi Orlandini (born 1972), Italian footballer
Raúl Orlandini (1952–2006), Peruvian racing driver
Rodolfo Orlandini (1905–1990), Argentine footballer and manager
Vincenzo Orlandini (1910–1961), Italian football referee

Italian-language surnames